The FIA Motorsport Games Digital Cup was the first FIA Motorsport Games Digital Cup, to be held at ACI Vallelunga Circuit, Italy on 1 November to 2 November 2019. The event was the part of the 2019 FIA Motorsport Games.

Entry list

Qualifying

Semi-finals and Repechage
Drivers qualified for the Finale highlighted in green. Drivers qualified for the Repechage highlighted in blue.

Semi-final group A

Semi-final group B

Semi-final group C

Repechage

Grand Final

References

External links

Digital Cup